Vidyavihar is a city and a municipality in Jhunjhunu district in the Indian state of Rajasthan.

Demographics
 India census, Vidyavihar had a population of 14,366. Males constitute 60% of the population and females 40%. Vidyavihar has an average literacy rate of 83%, higher than the national average of 59.5%: male literacy is 89%, and female literacy is 74%. In Vidyavihar, 8% of the population is under 6 years of age.

References

Cities and towns in Jhunjhunu district